John Peterson is the name of: 

John B. Peterson (1850–1944), American politician from Indiana
John E. Peterson (born 1938), American politician from Pennsylvania
John Peterson (American football) (born 1948), football coach, Frostburg State University, Maryland
John Peterson (wrestler) (born 1948), American wrestler and Olympic champion in Freestyle wrestling
John Peterson (golfer) (born 1989), American professional golfer
John W. Peterson (1921–2006), American songwriter
John Peterson (author) (1924–2002), American author of children's books
John Bertram Peterson (1871–1944), Catholic bishop of Manchester, 1932–1944

See also
John Petersen (disambiguation)
Jack Peterson (disambiguation)